Two ships in the United States Navy have been named USS Terry for Edward A. Terry. 

 The first  was a modified  launched in 1909 and served in World War I. She served in the United States Coast Guard from 1924 to 1930. She was sold in 1934. 
 The second  was a  launched in 1942 and decommissioned by 1947 after serving in World War II. 

United States Navy ship names